Traian Sports Hall is an indoor arena in Râmnicu Vâlcea, Romania. It is primarily used for handball. The hall was renovated in 2011.

References

Indoor arenas in Romania
Handball venues in Romania
Râmnicu Vâlcea
1982 establishments in Romania